Muhammad Hasan Khan (1742-1778) was the second Khan of Ganja from 1768 to 1780 from the Ziyadoglu branch of the Qajar clan who ruled the Beylerbeylik of Karabakh as hereditary governors.

Background 
He was born in 1742 to Shahverdi Khan and his Armenian wife Gulgoncha in Ganja.

Reign 
He came to power in 1768 or 1761 after the murder of his father, Shahverdi Khan, with the Georgian help. He paid great attention to the economic development of the Ganja Khanate, especially to the development of sericulture. Khan invited many silkworm breeders from Georgia to permanent residence in Ganja, causing a negative reaction from Heraclius II, who instructed his wife, Queen Darejan, to take measures to prevent this resettlement. Queen, who at that time was actually involved in all government affairs, ordered the treasurer of the court, Joseph, to return the settlers in any way possible.

According to Bakikhanov, in 1769, Utsmi of Qaytaq, Emir Hamza with 3000 selected cavalry passed through Derbend, Quba and Shirvan and attacked Ardabil. Having devastated this region, he attacked Ganja through Karabakh and ruined its surroundings more than the Ardabil district. After that, through Shaki, Akhty, and the Kura, he returned Muhammad Hasan Khan had to seek help from the ruler of Kartli-Kakheti. According to Nikita Panin's report in 1770, he was still paying 10.000 tomans to Georgia as tribute.

Death 
In 1778, during the palace strife, his brother Muhammad Khan overthrew him and took power in Ganja into his own hands. Some sources report his death date as 1792. He had a son named Ali agha.

References

Sources 

 

Khans of Ganja
Qajar tribe
1778 deaths
1742 births